Portnadler Bay lies 1.5 miles to the south-west of the town of Looe, Cornwall. It contains a secluded beach that is reachable on foot via a steep path that descends from the main coastal path.

References

Bays of Cornwall